Jaisithok Mandan is a village development committee in Kabhrepalanchok District in Bagmati Province of central Nepal. At the time of the 1991 Nepal census it had a population of 2,492 and had 458 houses in it.
now it has become municipality mandan municipality

References

External links
UN map of the municipalities of Kavrepalanchowk District

Populated places in Kavrepalanchok District